Shivaji Park, officially Chhatrapati Shivaji Maharaj Park, is a public park situated in Dadar, Mumbai. It is the largest park in the island city. Similar but bigger in size to Azad Maidan and August Kranti Maidan (formerly Gowalia Tank Grounds), it is of historical and cultural value because of the political and social gatherings it has witnessed, both in pre- and post-independence Mumbai. The  of open space is renowned as having been a cradle of the game of cricket in India. The park has a variety of sports facilities including cricket nets, Tennis court, a Mallakhamba area and a football pitch amongst others.

Geography

The open ground or maidan is flanked around its edge by a katta, a simple continuous low kerb edging that forms a makeshift seat - a popular hangout for the young and old alike. The paved walkway around this perimeter is crowded with joggers and people taking walks. The remaining part of the ground and open spaces is available to the public for sports and other activities. Other structures dotting the periphery of the grounds include the Samarth Vyayam Mandir (a gymnasium), Shivaji Park Nagarik Sangh (established in 1947), a children's playground, a park for the elderly called Nana-Nani Park, or Grandparents Park, the Scout's Pavilion, a Hindu temple dedicated to Ganesh, and a community library. The walkway is lined with large rain trees.

The most prominent entrance to the park is the one on the east side, intended only for pedestrians. A bust of Meenatai Thackeray, late wife of Shiv Sena leader Bal Thackeray, has been placed at this entrance. Previously a bust of Ram Ganesh Gadkari was present at the same spot. Bal Thackeray himself was cremated here.

History

The park was established in 1925 by the Bombay Municipal Corporation, during British Rule. It was known as the Mahim Park until 1927, when it was renamed after the 17th century king of the region, Shivaji, at the behest of a municipal councilor, Avantika Gohkale. The Shivaji Park Gymkhana, then known as the Dadar Hindu Gymkhana, opened its first Tennis court on the grounds in 1927 and inaugurated its pavilion in November 1931.

Besides being a venue for gatherings of freedom fighters in British India, after independence in 1947, Shivaji Park was the focal point of the Samyukta Maharashtra Chalval (the struggle for a consolidated Maharashtra) that led to the present Indian state of Maharashtra being formed in 1960. During this period, the legendary writer, journalist, playwright, poet and social leader Acharya Prahlad Keshav Atre led this movement, addressing crowds of hundreds of thousands at this ground, earning him the title of the 'Lord of Shivaji Park'.

Shivaji Park has been integral to the political gatherings of the local political party Shiv Sena, and has witnessed numerous other political rallies. In May 2010, the Bombay High Court declared the ground a silence zone after local residents filed a public interest litigation suit in September 2009, complaining about the noise pollution in the area on account of political rallies and gatherings.

The Brihanmumbai Municipal Corporation renamed the park from Shivaji Park to Chhatrapati Shivaji Maharaj Park on 12 March 2020.

Statue

The statue of Shivaji, found on the western side of the park is one of the very few statues in which he is depicted without having drawn out his sword. Instead, Shivaji is shown simply leading the way with his arm outstretched. Sculpted in 1966 using donations from the local population, the statue is a rare example of the pacifist policies of the then state government of Maharashtra. It was considered a sensitive issue by the government to let this statue not depict the usual confrontational posture of Shivaji, who had fought many battles against the Mughal Empire.

Cricket

Shivaji Park is renowned as the cradle of Indian cricket. It is home to eight cricket clubs, such as those of Anna Vaidya and Ramakant Acharekar, which produced several international cricket players for India.

Some famous players who have trained here are Sachin Tendulkar, Ajit Wadekar, Vijay Manjrekar, Eknath Solkar, Chandrakant Pandit, Lalchand Rajput, Sandeep Patil, Ajit Agarkar, Pravin Amre, Vinod Kambli, Ajinkya Rahane and now Prithvi Shaw.

Surroundings

The area surrounding the park has many buildings dating back to the mid-1900s, and the Shivaji Park Residential Zone is some of the more sought-after real estate in Mumbai.The predominantly Marathi neighbourhood is home to well-known personalities from literature, theatre, commerce and sports. 

Some notable residents include:
 Manohar Joshi – politician, former chief minister of Maharashtra, and speaker of the Lok Sabha
 Raj Thackeray – politician and founder of the Maharashtra Navnirman Sena
 Anup Jalota – musician and Bhajan singer
 Milind Soman – actor and model
 Sunil Prabhu – politician and former mayor of the city of Mumbai
 Ajit Agarkar – Indian cricketer
 Ajit Wadekar – Indian cricketer
 Sandeep Patil – Indian cricketer
 Sachin Tendulkar - Indian cricketer
 Dada Kondke – actor and film producer
 Dilip Prabhavalkar – actor, writer and film director

See also
Dadar
 Shivaji Park Residential Zone

References

External links

Satellite view of Shivaji Park

•  Shivaji Park Dadar Instagram Page
Neighbourhoods in Mumbai
Parks in Mumbai
Monuments and memorials to Shivaji
1925 establishments in India